Thomas Daley (15 November 1933 – 23 January 2020) was a professional footballer born in Grimsby, Lincolnshire, who played as a goalkeeper in the Football League for Grimsby Town and  Huddersfield Town. He later played for Peterborough United, Gainsborough Trinity and Boston United in non-league football.

References

1933 births
2020 deaths
English footballers
Association football goalkeepers
Grimsby Town F.C. players
Huddersfield Town A.F.C. players
Peterborough United F.C. players
Gainsborough Trinity F.C. players
Boston United F.C. players
English Football League players
Gainsborough Trinity F.C. managers
Footballers from Grimsby
Place of birth missing
English football managers